A windjammer is a commercial sailing ship with multiple masts that may be square rigged, or fore-and-aft rigged, or a combination of the two. The informal term "windjammer" arose during the transition from the Age of Sail to the Age of Steam during the 19th century. The Oxford English Dictionary records the word "windjamming" from 1886 and "windjammer" with reference to a ship from 1892. The term has evolved to include such a vessel, carrying passengers on overnight cruises in the Caribbean, the U.S. state of Maine and elsewhere.

Etymology

The word "windjammer" has a variety of associations, both nautical and not. In the late 19th century the term was pejorative, as used by sailors aboard steamships.

 In 1892, Rudder Magazine said in a story, "The deck hands on the liners contemptuously refer to [sailing vessels] as 'wind-jammers'."
 In 1917, the American Dialect Society recorded residents of the U.S. state of Maine referring to fore-and-aft sailing vessels as "windjammers" in a list of regional word usages.
The Oxford Companion to Ships and the Sea calls windjammer "a non-nautical name by which square-rigged sailing ships are sometimes known".
 The Oxford Essential Dictionary of the U.S. Military calls windjammer "a merchant sailing ship".
The following languages have adopted "windjammer" as a loanword from English in reference to sailing ships:
 Czech: windjammer
 Dutch: windjammer
German: Windjammer
Japanese: ウィンドジャマー
Polish: windjammer
 Russian: винджаммер
Serbo-Croatian:  виндјамер or vindjamer
Ukrainian: вінджамер

Green's Dictionary of Slang has a variety of non-nautical definitions for the term.

Examples

Any of the following ships may be called a "windjammer":
Barque
Barquentine
Brig
Brigantine
Clipper ship
Full-rigged ship
Iron-hulled sailing ship
Sail-powered cruise ship
Schooner

In literature
Windjammers have figured prominently in both historical and fictional literature. Some examples include:

References

Merchant sailing ship types
Sailboat types
Sailing ships
Tall ships
19th-century neologisms